Quest is an American jazz band, which includes saxophonist Dave Liebman, pianist Richie Beirach, bassist Ron McClure, and drummer Billy Hart. The original band line-up included bassists George Mraz and drummer Al Foster. They were featured on the group's first album only; all subsequent recordings feature the Liebman/Beirach/McClure/Hart line-up.

Discography
 1981: Quest (Trio [Japan]; Palo Alto)
 1987: Quest II  (Storyville)
 1987: Quest III: Midpoint – Live at Montmartre (Storyville)
 1988: N.Y. Nites: Standards  (Storyville)
 1988: Natural Selection  (Evidence)
 1990: Of One Mind  (CMP)
 2007: Redemption: Quest Live in Europe  (HatOLOGY)
 2010: Re-Dial: Live in Hamburg  (Outnote)
 2010: Searching for the New Sound of Be-Bop  (Storyville) (Compiles three complete previously released albums: Quest II, Quest III: Midpoint, and Double Edge, a Liebman/Beirach duo recording.) 
 2013: Live in Paris 2010 (Vaju Prod.) (download only; no CD release)
 2013: Circular Dreaming: Quest Plays the Music of Miles' 60's (Enja)

References

American jazz ensembles
Palo Alto Records artists